Rhatha Phongam (born 19 May 1983), nickname Ying, is a Thai actress and singer. She is best known internationally for her supporting role in Only God Forgives in 2013.

She has obtained a bachelor and a master's degree in Communication Arts from Bangkok University.

Filmography

Voice roles

Television series

Sitcoms

Plays

Discography

Solo albums

Special albums

Singles

Soundtracks

Music Videos

MC 
 2018 : The Couple: Ep.1 [1/5] Paris to Berlin On Air YouTube:The Couple YT

References

External links

1983 births
Living people
Rhatha Phongam
Rhatha Phongam
Rhatha Phongam
Rhatha Phongam
Rhatha Phongam
Rhatha Phongam
Rhatha Phongam
Rhatha Phongam
Rhatha Phongam
Rhatha Phongam
Rhatha Phongam
Rhatha Phongam